Hadh: Life on the Edge of Death is a 2001  Bollywood film directed by Thampi Kannanthanam in his Bollywood debut and produced by Sandeep D. Shinde. It stars Jackie Shroff, Sharad Kapoor, Ayesha Jhulka and Suman Ranganathan in pivotal roles.

Plot

Cast
 Jackie Shroff...Vishwa
 Sharad Kapoor...Shiva
 Ayesha Jhulka
 Suman Ranganathan
 Tej Sapru...Chotey
 Vikram Gokhale...Commissioner Shastri
 Kiran Kumar...Dalal

Soundtrack

References

External links

2000s Hindi-language films
2001 films
Films scored by Viju Shah
Indian action drama films
Indian gangster films
Films directed by Thampi Kannanthanam
2001 action drama films